James William Holden (born 4 September 2001) is an English professional footballer who plays as a goalkeeper for Dulwich Hamlet on loan from Cambridge United.

Club career

Bury
Holden joined Bury in February 2019 going straight into the side for their FA Youth Cup quarter final defeat to Liverpool. Holden became a free agent following the club's expulsion from the EFL in September in 2019.

Reading
Following a short trial Holden joined Reading in September 2019. At the end of the same month, Holden joined Bognor Regis Town on loan. On 4 October, after two clean sheets in two games for Bognor Regis Town, Holden joined Bracknell Town on a short-term loan deal. 

On 2 July 2020, Reading announced that Holden had signed professional terms with the club.

On 11 May 2021, Holden was offered a new contract by Reading, the day before joining Maidenhead United on loan for the remainder of the season.

On 2 July 2021, Reading announced that Holden had signed new one-year contract. Later that month, Holden joined Maidenhead United on a season-long loan deal. He was recalled from his loan deal on 10 January 2022.

On 20 May 2022, Reading confirmed Holden would be released by the club when his contract ended on 30 June 2022.

Cambridge United
On 18 May 2022, Cambridge United announced that Holden would join the club on a two-year contract.

In February 2023, Holden joined National League South club Dulwich Hamlet on a one-month loan deal.

Career statistics

Club

References

External links
England profile at The Football Association

2001 births
Living people
English footballers
Association football goalkeepers
Reading F.C. players
Bognor Regis Town F.C. players
Bracknell Town F.C. players
Maidenhead United F.C. players
Cambridge United F.C. players
Dulwich Hamlet F.C. players
Isthmian League players
National League (English football) players